Gerard Houlton (25 April 1939 - ) was an English cricketer active from 1961 to 1963 who played for Lancashire. He was born in St Helens, Lancashire. He appeared in 20 first-class matches, scoring 688 runs with a highest score of 86 and held five catches.

References

1939 births
2018 deaths
Cricketers from St Helens, Merseyside
English cricketers
Lancashire cricketers